Aweil is a city in South Sudan and the capital of the Northern Bahr el Ghazal.

Location

Aweil is located in Aweil Centre County, Aweil State, in northwestern South Sudan, near the International border with the Republic of Sudan and the Abyei Region. The coordinates of Aweil are: 8° 46' 02.00"N, 27° 23' 59.00"E (Latitude: 8.7671; Longitude: 27.3998).

Overview
Aweil is the capital city of Northern Bahr el Ghazal. It is also the county seat of Aweil Centre County. The city's infrastructure is relatively developed. Aweil now has a functioning railway station, hotel, airport, soccer stadium, and a public hospital. The city functions as a team site for the United Nations Mission in South Sudan. Several NGOs providing aid in South Sudan are based here.

The topography is flat and is prone to flooding, although the city itself lies on higher ground that the surrounding plains. The city lies close to the confluence of the Lol River with the Pongo River. During the rainy season, the plain-dwellers seek refuge on higher ground in the city of Aweil.

Socially and economically vibrant, Aweil is one of the most peaceful cities within South Sudan's Ten States. Peace within the region has provided an economic boost, secondly most Aweilians remain unaffected by political decision making, they no longer have issues with cattle raiding and ethnic or tribal violence.

Demographic
The population of the Aweil city fluctuates. During the dry season, the population is lower as the plain-dwellers return to the plains to tend to their gardens and harvest their crops. When the rains  come and the plains flood, they return to the city, to escape the raging waters. In November 2008, Médecins Sans Frontières estimated the town's population at about 100,000, but there is no verified population figure.

Sports 

Aweil is sporting town, it has many footballing clubs, it also has fans for Spanish major clubs such as Real Madrid and Barcelona.

Transport 

Aweil has a railway station on the line to Wau built in the 1960s. After a period of disuse due to civil war damage, the line and the station were restored to use in 2010. The railway passes through Aweil South County to Wau. Aweil is served by Aweil Airport to Juba. In 2012 the local airline stopped flying.

Governance
The current governor of Northern Bhar El Ghazal state is Tong Akeen Ngor.

Education
University of Northern Bahr el Ghazal is located in eastern Mathiang residential area, just next to western UNMISS Compound.

Cathedral
Aweil is also the seat of an Anglican Diocese. Bishop Abraham Nhial is the Bishop of the Diocese of Aweil and the Cathedral is Holy Trinity Cathedral in Aweil, a medium-sized building of brick contraction in the typical cross floorplan common to many churches in Africa.

Points of interest

The following points of interest are found in or near Aweil:

 The headquarters of Aweil State Administration 
 The headquarters of Aweil Centre County Administration
 The teak plantation is planted in southern Aweil town, to the west of a railway that runs to wau; rumours circulating the city that the scheme belongs to Paul Malong Awan, the scheme is founded in 2016, for production of electricity-poles.
 The women market was built in Hai-Salaam (Block of Peace) which lies to north-east of Aweil, in 2017 by UNDP prior to economic development and stabilisation programme which aims to address the multi-dimensional needs of people in the region.
 The offices of Aweil Town Council
 South Sudan Hotel - A private hospitality establishment
 Aweil Railway Station
 Aweil Airport
 Aweil Civil Hospital - One of the only three referral hospitals in South Sudan
 St. George Catholic Church - A place of worship
 Aweil Rice Scheme
 Aweil Soccer Field
 University of Northern Bahr El-Ghazal 
 St. Mary's Girls Secondary School - A secondary school for girls, owned and administered by the Aweil Dioceses of the Episcopal Church of the Sudan (ECS)

See also
 Aweil Airport
 Aweil State

Notable people
Valentino Achak Deng
Madut Aluk
Paul Malong Awan
Aaron Yaivek

References

External links
 
  Location of Aweil At Google Maps
 Aweil Students graduates Network

State capitals in South Sudan
Populated places in Northern Bahr el Ghazal
Bahr el Ghazal